Multiplication is the process in Western alchemy used to increase the potency of the philosopher's stone, elixir or projection powder. It occurs near the end of the magnum opus in order to increase the gains in the subsequent projection. George Ripley gives the following definition of multiplication:

Multiplication was also used to describe the facet of alchemy chiefly concerned with the reproduction of physical gold and silver.   Such is the case in  Henry IV's 1404 statute against the craft of multiplication. Henry VI began to issue  patents for the practice of alchemy, but the parliamentary act against multipliers was not repealed until 1689.

Method
In his discussion of multiplication, Ripley goes on to compare the medicine or elixir to fire. He notes that the methods of multiplication are related to the processes of congelation, cibation, and fermentation.  In doing so he also hints at multiplication's internal significance.

Like Ripley, other sources describe multiplication as subjecting the philosopher's stone to further maturation by reiterating the same processes as was used to originally make it. Sendivogius writes, "Having made an End with the Composition of the Lapis, there remains its Multiplication in infinitum which is effected by the same way and with the same operations the Lapis was made; only that instead of dissolved Gold or Silver, you lay in only so much of the Lapis as you laid in before of the said Gold or Silver for the first Confection of the Lapis."  Comparisons to plant and animal reproduction were also made.

References 

Alchemical processes